Reinhold Schneider (Baden-Baden, May 13, 1903 – Freiburg im Breisgau, April 6, 1958) was a German poet who also wrote novels. Initially his works were less religious, but later his poetry had a Christian and  specifically Catholic influence. His first works included ones about Luís de Camões and Portugal.

He had written anti-war poems, which were banned in Nazi Germany. Las Casas (1938) had analysed the ways Christians should respond to state oppression, and had criticised Nazi persecution and anti-Semitism; this led to the ban on publishing his works.

During the war associates of Schneider were in the 'Kreisau Circle' and the 'Freiburger Konzil' which had links with anti-Nazi resistance. His works were still published in Karl Ludwig Freiherr von und zu Guttenbergs journal White Papers and "underground", and tracts were distributed to soldiers at the front. Though he was accused of treason by authoring defeatist literature, the war ended before he could be tried.

Works
 Apokalypse (1946): an anthology of sonnets.
 Begegnung und Bekenntnis. Literarische Essays (1963) 
 Briefe an einen Freund. Mit Erinnerungen von Otto Heuschele 
 Briefwechsel/Reinhold Schneider, Leopold Zeigler (1960) 
 Das Inselreich (1936) 
 Das Leiden des Camões (1930) 
 Der große Verzicht (1950): drama. 
 Die Hohenzollern. Tragik und Königtum (1933) 
 Die Tarnkappe (1951): drama. 
 Innozenz und Franziskus (1952): drama. 
  (1938) 
 Pfeiler im Strom (1958) 
 Philipp der Zweite (1931) 
 Tagebuch: 1930-1935 
 Über Dichter und Dichtung (1953) 
 Verhüllter Tag, Bekenntnis eines Lebens (1954) 
 Verpflichtung und Liebe (1964) 
 Winter in Wien (1958): a diary account of Schneider's stay in Vienna during 1957.

Awards
Peace Prize of the German Book Trade (1956)
Pour le Mérite (Friedensklasse) (1952)
Honorary doctorates bestowed by the University of Freiburg and the University of Münster (1946/47)
Droste-Preis (1948)
Longfellow-Preis (1948)

External links
 German Literature Companion: Reinhold Schneider

References

1903 births
1958 deaths
Christian poets
Christian novelists
German Catholic poets
German anti-fascists
German resistance members
20th-century German novelists
20th-century German poets
German male poets
German male novelists
Members of the Academy of Arts, Berlin
Recipients of the Pour le Mérite (civil class)
20th-century German male writers
Roman Catholics in the German Resistance